James E. Ray (born January 12, 1934) is an American former professional basketball player. Ray was selected in the 1956 NBA draft by the Syracuse Nationals after a collegiate career at Toledo.

References

External links
University of Toledo Hall of Fame entry

1934 births
Living people
American men's basketball players
Basketball players from Cincinnati
Point guards
Syracuse Nationals draft picks
Syracuse Nationals players
Toledo Rockets men's basketball players